The Samson Remote Controlled Weapon Station (RCWS), also known as Katlanit (קטלנית in Hebrew: "lethal", female inflection) is a Remote Weapon System that enables a variety of devices to be operated automatically or by remote control, including 5.56 mm, 7.62 mm, and 12.7 mm .50 BMG machine guns, 40 mm automatic grenade launchers, anti-tank missiles and observation pods. There are a total of three variants of the Samson family:

 Samson Jr. ROWS - for 5.56 mm and 7.62 mm machine guns, weighing .
 Mini Samson ROWS - for 12.7 mm and 14.5 mm machine guns, as well as 40 mm grenade launcher, weighing , similar to that of Mini Typhoon naval ROWS and OWS.

For example, the Samson Remote Controlled Weapon System for 30 mm autocannon is designed to be mounted on lightly-armoured, high-mobility military vehicles and operated by a gunner or vehicle commander operating under-the-deck. It offers optional SPIKE guided missile, smoke grenade launcher, and embedded trainer. The RCWS 30 is a product of Rafael Advanced Defense Systems.

Israel has also installed a variant of the Samson RCWS in pillboxes along the Israeli Gaza Strip barrier intended to prevent Hamas terrorists from entering its territory.

The Sentry Tech system, dubbed Roeh-Yoreh (Sees-Fires) in IDF service deployed on the Gaza fence, enables camera operators located in a rear-located intelligence base to engage border threats using the 12.7 mm heavy machine gun and the SPIKE guided missile. Dozens of terrorists have been killed with the Sentry Tech system. The first reported death of an individual  appears to have taken place during Operation Cast Lead in December 2008.

Operators

Current operators
 :
 :
 : LAV III
 : 4 stations initially procured for needs of Croatian Army, installed and tested on M84D and M95 tanks, but eventually Croatian Army opted for Protector RWS, 12.7 mm and 30 mm.
 : Pandur II
 : IDF Namer, some IDF Achzarit, some HMMWV
 : 100 units
 : RG-31 Nyala
 : Otokar Cobra
 : Hunter AFV
 : Hyundai Wia
 : Alvis Stormer
 : 88 German Boxer Infantry Fighting Vehicles with Rafael's weapon stations with 30 mm cannons and “Spike LR” antitank missiles

References

Vehicle weapons
Rafael Advanced Defense Systems
Remote weapon stations